The Southern League Most Valuable Player Award (MVP) is an annual award given to the best player in Minor League Baseball's Southern League based on their regular-season performance as voted on by league managers. League broadcasters, Minor League Baseball executives, and members of the media have previously voted as well. Though the league was established in 1964, the award was not created until 1972. After the cancellation of the 2020 season, the league was known as the Double-A South in 2021 before reverting to the Southern League name in 2022.

Twenty-one outfielders have won the MVP Award, the most of any position. First basemen, with 14 winners, have won the most among infielders, followed by third basemen (4) and second basemen and shortstops (2). Eight catchers have also won the award.

Five players from the Huntsville Stars and Tennessee Smokies have been selected for the MVP Award, more than any other teams in the league, followed by the Carolina Mudcats, Columbus Mudcats, Memphis Chicks, and Montgomery Biscuits (4); the Birmingham Barons, Chattanooga Lookouts, Jackson Generals, and Jacksonville Suns (3); the Biloxi Shuckers, Greenville Braves, Mobile BayBears, and Nashville Sounds (2); and the Asheville Orioles, Charlotte O's, Mississippi Braves, Montgomery Rebels, and Orlando Twins (1).

Six players from the Chicago White Sox Major League Baseball (MLB) organization have won the award, more than any other, followed by the Houston Astros, Milwaukee Brewers, and Tampa Bay Rays organizations (4); the Arizona Diamondbacks, Atlanta Braves, Cincinnati Reds, Kansas City Royals, and Oakland Athletics organizations (3); the Baltimore Orioles, Detroit Tigers, Minnesota Twins, New York Yankees, Pittsburgh Pirates, Toronto Blue Jays, and Washington Nationals organizations (2); and the Chicago Cubs, Miami Marlins, San Diego Padres, and Seattle Mariners organizations (1).

Winners

Wins by team

Active Southern League teams appear in bold.

Wins by organization

Active Southern League–Major League Baseball affiliations appear in bold.

Notes

References
Specific

General

Awards established in 1972
Minor league baseball trophies and awards
Minor league baseball MVP award winners
MVP